Erin Matson (writer) (born 1980), American writer and feminist activist
Erin Matson (field hockey) (born 2000), American field hockey player